Brynja Þorsteinsdóttir (born 29 May 1977) is an Icelandic alpine skier. She competed in three events at the 1998 Winter Olympics.

References

1977 births
Living people
Brynja Thorsteinsdóttir
Brynja Thorsteinsdóttir
Alpine skiers at the 1998 Winter Olympics
Brynja Thorsteinsdóttir
20th-century Icelandic women